Mohammad Salameh Al Nabulsi is the Jordanian Minister of Youth. He was appointed as minister on 12 October 2020.

Education 
Al Nabulsi holds a Bachelor in Political Studies (2004) from the American University of Beirut and a Master in Development Studies (2007) from London School of Economics.

References 

Living people
21st-century Jordanian politicians
Alumni of the London School of Economics
American University of Beirut alumni
Government ministers of Jordan
Year of birth missing (living people)